Janie Ward-Engelking (born in Caldwell, Idaho) is an American politician serving as a Democratic member of the Idaho Senate, representing District 18 since December 2013. She previously represented District 18 Seat A in the Idaho House of Representatives.

Education
After attending Whittier College, Ward-Engelking earned her Bachelor of Arts degree from Idaho State University and her Master of Arts from Boise State University.

Elections

In November 2013 Ward-Engelking expressed interest in being appointed to the Idaho Senate to succeed Durst, who resigned. On December 20, 2013, Gov. Butch Otter appointed her to the Idaho Senate to finish Durst's term.

References

External links
Janie Ward-Engelking at the Idaho Legislature
Campaign site

21st-century American politicians
21st-century American women politicians
Living people
Boise State University alumni
Idaho State University alumni
Democratic Party Idaho state senators
Democratic Party members of the Idaho House of Representatives
People from Caldwell, Idaho
Whittier College alumni
Women state legislators in Idaho
Year of birth missing (living people)